Maxie's World is an American animated children's television program produced by DIC Animation City. Distributed by Claster Television and Saban International and originally aired in first-run syndication in the United States from September 14, 1987 through October 27, 1987. It consists of one season, comprising a total of 32 episodes, each 15 minutes long. In the series' original run, Maxie's World alternated on weekdays with Beverly Hills Teens and It's Punky Brewster. The series was briefly reran on USA Network in 1994.

Developed for television by Phil Harnage, and executive produced by Andy Heyward, the series was conceived as a tie-in to the Hasbro line of "Maxie" fashion dolls. The title character Maxie is a straight-"A" student, cheerleader, and surfer girl, who attends Surfside High School in California. In addition to her life as a "typical" teenager, she routinely finds adventure solving crimes and investigating mysteries as host of her own TV show.

Premise
The series takes place in the fictional seaside town of "Surfside" and follows the adventures of teenager Maxie and her circle of friends. She attends Surfside High School where she is a popular straight "A" student, cheerleader and surfer girl, while after school, she serves as host and investigative reporter of her own eponymous talk show Maxie's World. Through her work as a journalist, she routinely finds herself called upon to investigate mysteries and solve crimes, bringing the perpetrators to justice. Frequently accompanying Maxie in her adventures is her boyfriend, Rob, a handsome and popular football and soccer star at Surfside High.

Additional members of Maxie's circle of friends include Ashley, Carly and Simone, while male friends Mushroom and Ferdie routinely provide the series with its slapstick comedy elements. Providing much of the series' conflict is Jeri, who is envious of Maxie and is often shown manipulating events to humiliate the TV star in an attempt to sabotage her career and get her own TV show. In addition to the comedy and mystery elements, the series occasionally takes the opportunity to address more serious issues, including one episode which deals with the issue of teenage smoking, and another, which deals with the issue of eating disorders.

Voice cast
Loretta Jafelice as Maxie
Simon Reynolds as Rob
Geoff Kahnert as Mushroom
Yannick Bisson as Ferdie
Suzanne Coy as Simone
Susan Roman as Ashley
Tara Charendoff as Carly Cooper  
John Stocker as Mr. Garcia
Nadine Rabinovitch as Jeri Jeffries
Diane Fabian as Additional Voices
Gary Krawford as Additional Voices
Greg Swanson as Additional Voices

Episodes

Home media
Beginning in 1987, select episodes were released in the United States on 30-minute, 60-minute, and 120 minute NTSC VHS tapes by Celebrity Home Entertainment's Just for Kids Mini Features line.  Beginning in 1991, select episodes were released in the United Kingdom on 30-minute, 60-minute, and 90-minute PAL VHS tapes by Abbey Home Entertainment.  The series was distributed by Claster Television, which was owned by Hasbro, the makers of the "Maxie" dolls. As a result, Hasbro must give approval before any future home video release of the series is made available. 

On October 6, 2015, Mill Creek Entertainment released Maxie's World - The Complete Series on DVD in Region 1 for the very first time.

UK VHS releases
 Abbey Home Media (and Tempo Super Video) (April 15, 1991 – May 6, 1991)

Australia VHS release
 Pickwick Video and Abbey Home Media (1991)

Crossover with Beverly Hills Teens 
On October 15, 1987, the Beverly Hills Teens made a crossover appearance on the animated DIC series Maxie's World. In the episode, entitled "Beach Blanket Battle", the Beverly Hills Teens visit Surfside High School to compete in a "Charity Challenge" against Maxie and her friends. As a crossover episode, certain elements of the Beverly Hills Teens character designs (such as hair color) were altered to help distinguish the Beverly Hills Teens from their Maxie's World counterparts.

Maxie toy line
The "Maxie" toy line was originally conceived by Hasbro in 1986 after second-year sales of its fashion doll, Jem, did not live up to the toy company's expectations. In March 1988, Maxie, an 11½-inch tall, blonde-haired, blue-eyed, "All-American" teenage fashion doll was introduced onto toy store shelves, and was described as a competitor to Mattel's Barbie. For the launch, Hasbro had reportedly spent an estimated 70% of its annual advertising budget ($7 million) marketing the new doll.

In addition to the television series tie-in, promotion consisted of live presentations and television advertisements which starred Brooke Theiss as the live model. Commercials would typically feature the Maxie doll at school or various other activities, then switch to Theiss as the "real life" Maxie, which Hasbro vice president of public relations and promotions, Wayne Charness, described at the time as "innovative advertising for a fashion doll". By October 1988, sales of Maxie were said to be strong, with Charness reporting, "She's right on target with our projections for the first year. We certainly look forward to Maxie to be around for a long time."

The Maxie doll was typically priced between $5.50–$13 (approximately $10–$25 in 2013 currency) which was considered a slightly more affordable price range than Mattel's Barbie, the #1 selling fashion doll at the time. In contrast to Barbie, who, by that time, had evolved into more "adult" careers and endeavors, Maxie was marketed as a decidedly teenaged high school student and was available in several variations, including numerous beach-themed "Makin' Waves" and "Sun Splash", "Cheerleader", "Slumber Party", "Ballerina", "Hula Hoop", and "Perfect Prom".

Also available as part of the toy line was Maxie's boyfriend, "Rob", and her best friends, blonde "Carly", redhead "Ashley", and African American "Kristen" (later renamed "Simone" in keeping with the television series). Accessories for Maxie included her horse, Tiffany, a sailboat play set, a locker and shower play set, a Surf Watchin' lifeguard play set, and a hot tub and patio play set, as well as "Fancy Face" makeup for her and "Mix 'n Match" and "Cool 'n Classy" fashion lines. Additional merchandise included Maxie paper dolls, coloring books and lunch boxes.

In 1989, Mattel answered Maxie with the introduction of Barbie's teenage cousin, Jazzie, her boyfriend, Dude, and her friends, Chelsie and Stacie.  Similar to Mattel's introduction of Barbie and the Rockers which was credited, in part, for the demise of Jem and the Holograms, the introduction of Jazzie was described as delivering the "coup de grâce" to Maxie and, in January 1990, Hasbro announced it was discontinuing the Maxie toy line.

References

External links

Maxie's World at DHXMedia.com

1987 American television series debuts
1987 American television series endings
1980s American daily animated television series
1980s toys
American children's animated action television series
American children's animated comedy television series
English-language television shows
First-run syndicated television programs in the United States
Television series by DIC Entertainment
Television shows based on Hasbro toys
Television series by Claster Television
Teen animated television series